Denzel Rice (born March 31, 1993) is an American football cornerback who is a free agent. He played college football at Coastal Carolina.

Professional career

Philadelphia Eagles
Rice was signed by the Philadelphia Eagles as an undrafted free agent in 2015. On August 28, 2016, Rice was waived by the Eagles.

Houston Texans
On October 19, 2016 Rice was signed to the Houston Texans' practice squad. He was promoted to the active roster on December 10, 2016.

On September 2, 2017, Rice was waived/injured by the Texans and placed on injured reserve. He was released on September 8, 2017.

Indianapolis Colts
On November 6, 2017, Rice was signed to the Indianapolis Colts' practice squad.

Cleveland Browns
On January 31, 2018, Rice signed a reserve/future contract with the Cleveland Browns. He made the Browns final roster, playing in eight games before being waived on November 7, 2018.

Buffalo Bills
On November 13, 2018, Rice was signed to the Buffalo Bills practice squad. He was promoted to the active roster on December 4, 2018. He was released on August 31, 2019.

Baltimore Ravens
On October 15, 2019, Rice was signed to the Baltimore Ravens practice squad. His practice squad contract with the team expired on January 20, 2020.

References

External links
 Philadelphia Eagles profile
 Coastal Carolina profile

1993 births
Living people
Players of American football from Winston-Salem, North Carolina
American football cornerbacks
Buffalo Bills players
Coastal Carolina Chanticleers football players
Philadelphia Eagles players
Houston Texans players
Indianapolis Colts players
Cleveland Browns players
Baltimore Ravens players